Bah Oumarou Sanda (born May 10, 1940) is a Cameroonian diplomat and Magistratee. He is a member of the Cameroon's Constitutional Council since February 2018.

He has been Cameroon's Ambassador to Chad from February 2008 to February 2018.

Oumarou was Deputy Secretary-General of the National Assembly of Cameroon before President Paul Biya appointed him as Ambassador to Chad on 22 February 2008.

References

Cameroonian diplomats
Ambassadors of Cameroon to Chad
Living people
Year of birth missing (living people)